Chelsea White (born 27 January 1990) is an English Page 3 girl and glamour model, photographer and make-up artist noted for starring in BBC Three's documentary Page Three Teens.

Career 
Chelsea was born in Bournemouth and has been modelling since the age of six. She was a successful child model, featuring in several notable magazines, brochures and commercials.

As her childhood modelling career was coming to an end, Chelsea faced the decision of whether to move into glamour modelling. This was the subject of the TV documentary Page Three Teens, in which she sought advice from family, modelling agencies and other models.

Chelsea made her debut in The Sun newspaper at the age of 18. She is now concentrating on her other talents, photography and make-up artistry.

See also

 Lad culture
 Lad mags

References

External links
 

1990 births
English female models
Living people
Glamour models
Page 3 girls
People from Bournemouth